The 1891 Philadelphia Athletics season was a season in American baseball. The team, which had played the 1890 season in the defunct Players' League, joined the American Association as a replacement for the previous version of the Philadelphia Athletics, who were expelled after the 1890 season. They finished with a 73–66 record and fifth place in the AA. This league folded after the 1891 season and the team disbanded with it.

Regular season

Season standings

Record vs. opponents

Opening Day lineup

Roster

Player stats

Batting

Starters by position 
Note: Pos = Position; G = Games played; AB = At bats; H = Hits; Avg. = Batting average; HR = Home runs; RBI = Runs batted in

Other batters 
Note: G = Games played; AB = At bats; H = Hits; Avg. = Batting average; HR = Home runs; RBI = Runs batted in

Pitching

Starting pitchers 
Note: G = Games pitched; IP = Innings pitched; W = Wins; L = Losses; ERA = Earned run average; SO = Strikeouts

References 
 1891 Philadelphia Athletics team page at Baseball Reference

Philadelphia Athletics season